Ibodutant was a candidate drug for irritable bowel syndrome diarrhea, developed by The Menarini Group. , it underwent a multicentre double blind efficacy clinical study. Ibodutant selectively blocks the tachykinin receptor NK2, with blockade practically complete in nanomolar concentrations.  A phase 2 trial in Europe (the IRIS-2 trial) completed in May 2012 with positive results.  A 52-week phase 3 study was terminated as of 2015 because of low response and negative results of study NAK-06.

See also
 GR-159,897
 Nepadutant
 Saredutant

References

Further reading 

 
 

Tachykinin receptor antagonists
NK2 receptor antagonists
Benzothiazoles
Carboxamides
Piperidines
Tetrahydropyrans
Cyclopentanes